Cooper Standard Automotive Inc., headquartered in Novi, Michigan, is a leading global supplier of systems and components for the automotive industry. Products include rubber and plastic sealing, fuel and brake lines, fluid transfer hoses and anti-vibration systems. Cooper Standard employs approximately 32,000 people globally and operates in 20 countries around the world. During World War II Standard Products produced  247,100 M1 Carbines, with the receiver of the carbines marked: "STD. PRO". They have manufacturing locations in New Lexington, OH, Surgoinsvile, TN and Stratford, Ontario, Canada, among 32 other manufacturing locations in North America and 107 manufacturing locations globally.

References

External links 
 Official web site

Privately held companies based in Michigan
Manufacturing companies based in Michigan
Novi, Michigan
Multinational companies headquartered in the United States
Companies that filed for Chapter 11 bankruptcy in 2009